The Öijared Ladies Open was a women's professional golf tournament on the Swedish Golf Tour played annually from 1996 until 2006. It was always held at the Öijared Golf Club in Lerum near Gothenburg, Sweden.

Winners

References

Swedish Golf Tour (women) events
Golf tournaments in Sweden
Defunct sports competitions in Sweden
Recurring sporting events established in 1996
Recurring sporting events disestablished in 2006